Kentucky Speedway is a  tri-oval speedway in Sparta, Kentucky, which has hosted ARCA, NASCAR and Indy Racing League racing annually since it opened in 2000. The track is currently owned and operated by Speedway Motorsports, Inc. Before 2008 Jerry Carroll, along with four other investors, were the majority owners of Kentucky Speedway. Depending on layout and configuration the track facility has a grandstand capacity of 107,000.

The speedway has hosted the NASCAR Gander RV & Outdoors Truck Series, NASCAR Xfinity Series, IndyCar Series, and the NASCAR Cup Series.

Track history

Early history and construction

When Jerry Carroll had first talked about racing, he meant horse racing not NASCAR.  "I went to my first race at the Daytona Speedway in Florida and got hooked," Carroll said. "I knew I had to get involved." This is what made Carroll and his four other investors to invest their money into a NASCAR track. Before Carroll took any action, he had a marketing group spend 15 months researching whether or not it would be a good location for a racing track to be put at the location they wanted. It was decided that it was a good location and soon after that they started removing 7 million cubic yards of dirt over 883 acres of land. After that decision was made Carroll decided to be a project manager for the next 20 months and get this race track up and running quickly. Another thing that was mentioned by Carroll was "Our first priority is to get the facility built and built right," to Carroll this project meant business for him. Carroll also asked other individual track owners and drivers and asked them what they would like in a track. This was the track would be perfect in all ways from racing surface to garage facility.

On January 8, 1998, Jerry Carroll announced that he and four other investors were going to build a $153 million racing facility in Sparta, Kentucky. Five months later, groundbreaking ceremonies were held on July 18, 1998. While construction continued, it was announced that the speedway would open with an ARCA race in 2000. Afterward, it was announced that the Indy Racing League IndyCar Series would promote a race following the ARCA race. Testing at the track began with Bill Baird, who participated in ARCA. In November 1999, it was announced that it would also hold a NASCAR Craftsman Truck Series race in 2000. The speedway continued to announce races for the 2000 racing season, one of which was a second ARCA race.

Several months later, the speedway decided to resurface the track because of bumps in the surface from winter. On June 16, 2000, the speedway opened with a Slim Jim All Pro Series event. One day later, the speedway held its first major series, the Craftsman Truck Series, which was won by Greg Biffle. In August of the same year, Buddy Lazier won the inaugural IndyCar Series race. On August 29, 2000, NASCAR announced that Kentucky Speedway would also sanction a Busch Series (now Xfinity Series) race in 2001. One year after the speedway opened, it held its first Busch Series event, with Kevin Harvick emerging as the winner.

2002–2011
During the 2002 Infiniti Pro Series (now Indy Lights) race at the track, Jason Priestley suffered a concussion and fractures to his thoracic spine and feet, becoming the first major injury to occur at the speedway. Three years later, Carroll began his efforts to receive a Nextel Cup Series event at the track. While trying to do so, Kentucky Speedway filed an anti-trust lawsuit against NASCAR and the International Speedway Corporation (ISC). The reason for the lawsuit was the claim that both companies violated federal antitrust laws because of restricting the awarding of Nextel Cup Series events. The lawsuit continued for three years before concluding in January 2008 with Judge William O. Bertelsman dismissing the trial with ISC and NASCAR winning the lawsuit. Following the dismissal, Judge Bertelsman commented, "After careful consideration and a thorough review of the record, and granting Kentucky Speedway the benefit of the doubt on all reasonable inferences therefrom, the court concludes that Speedway has failed to make out its case."

During May 2008, the speedway announced that Speedway Motorsports Inc. bought the speedway from Jerry Carroll. Bruton Smith invested $50 million in the speedway, and planned to move a NASCAR Cup Series event to the track by 2009. However, the speedway did not receive a NASCAR Cup Series event in the 2009 season.  Also in 2009, the lawsuit against NASCAR and ISC was dropped by Carroll, but other former owners of the speedway sued Carroll, therefore extending the lawsuit even further.

The speedway continued playing host to Camping World Truck Series, Nationwide Series, IndyCar, and Firestone Indy Lights Series events through 2010 and further. In 2010, both former owners of the speedway reached a settlement, ending the lawsuit.  In August 2010, it was announced that the speedway would hold its inaugural NASCAR Cup Series event, the Quaker State 400, during the 2011 season.  Before the first NASCAR Cup Series event, Kentucky Speedway expanded the capacity of the track of 107,000. The speedway also reconfigured pit road, and added 200 acres of camping.

The inaugural Quaker State 400 was held on July 9, 2011 and was won by Kyle Busch.  However, the race was overshadowed by numerous logistical problems. A massive traffic jam on Interstate 71 resulted in as many as 20,000 people being unable to get to the race. The traffic situation was so severe that at least one driver (Denny Hamlin) nearly missed the pre-race drivers' meeting. Many fans still en route by the halfway point of the race were asked to turn back in order to make it easier on those leaving the race. Speedway Motorsports admitted that it had not anticipated the sheer number of fans attending the event (the increased capacity notwithstanding) and had not made any significant upgrades to the infrastructure in and around the facility. Speedway officials apologized for the chaos and allowed those who didn't get in to redeem their tickets at Speedway Motorsports' other tracks for the rest of the season, or the 2012 Quaker State 400. In late 2011, the speedway purchased a 170-acre farm adjacent to its original property which was converted to parking. The purchase was a portion of more than 300 acres of land the speedway converted to parking. Additionally, speedway management began to work with the state government and police to improve event ingress and egress in time for the 2012 race.

2012–2020

In 2012, Kentucky Speedway did not host an IndyCar event for the first time in its history. That year, Brad Keselowski went on to win the second NASCAR Cup Series race held at Kentucky. Also in 2012, the Camping World Truck Series lost one of its two dates, focusing solely as part of the triple-header that headlines the Cup race. In 2013, the Cup race was postponed from Saturday night to Sunday afternoon due to rain; Matt Kenseth won the race, the only time it was held in daylight. In addition, the speedway also gained a second NASCAR Xfinity Series race, a 300-miler to be run that September; Ryan Blaney, the son of NASCAR driver Dave Blaney pulled off an upset by winning that event.

By 2014, NASCAR had become a staple at the track, with drivers praising the roughness and age of the surface. Brad Keselowski won the Cup race in 2014 from the pole, leading an unheard of 199 of the 267 laps to become the first driver to win two Cup races there. Kyle Busch, the inaugural winner, would become the second driver to do so in 2015, part of a three-race Kentucky win streak. The 2015 running marked the first race using NASCAR's low downforce package and the last race for Jeff Gordon there. Gordon finished seventh, leaving the track as the only facility at which he failed to win in his illustrious career.

In 2014, Stephen Cox was killed in a crash at Kentucky Speedway while participating in the Rusty Wallace Racing Experience. Cox was airlifted to the University of Cincinnati Medical Center and pronounced dead seven days later at the age of 30.

In December 2015, it was announced that the speedway would be repaved and partially reconfigured in 2016. This was necessary to fix drainage issues after a rain-plagued 2015 race weekend, when "weepers" — water being pushed up from below the surface —interfered with efforts to dry the track. In addition, turns 1 and 2 were narrowed from 72 to 56 feet to give cars coming out of the pits a wider apron, and the banking increased from 14 to 17 degrees. (Turns 3 and 4 remained 14 degrees.) A curing process was also used to make the new paving more "seasoned" and give the surface character. Finally, SAFER Barriers were added along the entirety of the outside wall. The completed project was first used in the July 2016 NASCAR weekend, during which Brad Keselowski scored his third win at the track by stretching his fuel to edge out Carl Edwards. 

Drivers reportedly liked the repaved track in 2016. "It's a pretty challenging racetrack" said Kyle Busch, who noted that it made the track more fun.

In 2017, Martin Truex Jr. won the Cup race at Kentucky on his way to winning the NASCAR Cup Series Championship. 

In 2018, NASCAR pulled Kentucky’s standalone Xfinity Series date to give the Las Vegas Motor Speedway a second triple-header race weekend in the fall. The 2018 tripleheader race weekend at Kentucky kicked off with the Thursday night NASCAR Camping World Truck Series (NCWTS) race. The race, which was won by Louisville native Ben Rhodes, marked the first Truck Series win by a driver from Kentucky since Michael Waltrip's 2011 Daytona Truck win. The other two races that weekend were both won by Toyota drivers. Christopher Bell won the Xfinity Series race after spinning in qualifying, and Martin Truex Jr. won the 2018 Quaker State 400 for back-to-back Cup Series wins at Kentucky. Truex's win also marked the last win for Furniture Row Racing before the team closed shop at the end of 2018 due to financial and sponsorship issues.

In the 2019 Quaker State 400, Kurt Busch became the first and currently only Chevrolet driver to win at Kentucky.

On September 29, 2020, it was reported that Kentucky Speedway would not be on the 2021 schedule for any of NASCAR's three national touring series (Cup, Xfinity, Truck).

2021
In May 2021, Ford parked 60,000 to 70,000 newly-built Super Duty pickup trucks at the speedway due to a global shortage of semiconductor chips needed to make the vehicles fully operational.

Track length of paved oval

The track length is disputed by the two major series that have run at Kentucky Speedway. This length was also used by IRL in their inaugural race in 2000.

NASCAR Cup Series winners

References

External links

 Kentucky Speedway Official Site
 
 Kentucky Speedway Page on NASCAR.com
 Jayski's Kentucky Speedway Page – Current and Past Kentucky Speedway News
 Super High Resolution image from Windows Live Local
Ky. Speedway death exposes gap in law (cincinnati.com)

NASCAR tracks
ARCA Menards Series tracks
IndyCar Series tracks
Motorsport venues in Kentucky
Buildings and structures in Gallatin County, Kentucky
Tourist attractions in Gallatin County, Kentucky